Quevillon is a commune in the Seine-Maritime department in the Normandy region in northern France.

Geography

Population

Places of interest
 The church of St.Martin, dating from the nineteenth century.
 The chapel of Saint-Jean, dating from the seventeenth century.
 The seventeenth century Château de La Rivière-Bourdet, with the chapel of Saint-Clotilde and a dovecote.
 A stone cross in the cemetery, erected in 1600.

See also
Communes of the Seine-Maritime department

References

Communes of Seine-Maritime